Thomas Colepeper, 2nd Baron Colepeper, (21 March 1635 – 27 January 1689) was an English peer and colonial administrator who served as the governor of Virginia from 1677 to 1683.

Biography

Born in 1635, Colepeper (often referred to by the alternate, Culpeper) was the son of Judith and John Colepeper. As a royalist, his father left England at the end of the English Civil War following the execution of Charles I. Thomas Culpeper lived with his father in the Netherlands and there on 3 August 1659 married the Dutch heiress Margaret van Hesse. He returned to England after Charles II's restoration, where his wife was naturalised as English by Act of Parliament.

Culpeper was made Governor of the Isle of Wight from 1661 to 1667 which involved little administration but added to his wealth. He was elected as a Bailiff to the board of the Bedford Level Corporation for 1665 and 1667.

He became governor of Virginia in July 1677 but did not leave England until 1679, when he was ordered to by Charles II.  While there, he seemed more interested in maintaining his land in the Northern Neck than governing and soon returned to England. Rioting in the colony forced him to return in 1682, by which time the riots were already quelled. After apparently appropriating £9,500 from the treasury of the colony, he returned to England and Charles II was forced to dismiss him, appointing in his stead Francis Howard, 5th Baron Howard of Effingham. During this tumultuous time, Culpeper's erratic behaviour meant that he had to rely increasingly on his cousin and Virginia agent, Col. Nicholas Spencer. (Spencer succeeded Culpeper as acting Governor on the Lord's departure from the colony.)

Culpeper lived the rest of his life in London with his mistress, Susannah Willis, and their two daughters.  He left a will in favour of Willis and her daughters that was suppressed. Catherine Culpeper, his only child with his wife Margaret van Hesse, inherited much of his wealth and married Thomas Fairfax, 5th Lord Fairfax of Cameron in 1690.

In Virginia, Culpeper County and its county seat, the town of Culpeper are named for him.

References

Oxford Dictionary of National Biography
 John T. Kneebone et al., eds., Dictionary of Virginia Biography (Richmond: Library of Virginia, 1998-  ), 3:596-598.

External links

  Thomas Colepeper at Encyclopedia Virginia

|-

1635 births
1689 deaths
Colonial governors of Virginia
2
Thomas